Kenji Yano (矢野 謙次, born September 21, 1980) is a Japanese former professional baseball outfielder. He played for the Yomiuri Giants and the Hokkaido Nippon-Ham Fighters. 

After his retirement in 2018, Yano was sent to the Texas Rangers for a year to train to be a coach. For the 2020 season, Yano will return to Japan as the Fighters' outfield coach and assistant hitting coach.

References

External links

NPB.com

1980 births
Living people
Hokkaido Nippon-Ham Fighters players
Japanese baseball coaches
Japanese baseball players
Japanese expatriate baseball people in the United States
Nippon Professional Baseball coaches
Nippon Professional Baseball outfielders
People from Mitaka, Tokyo
Baseball people from Tokyo Metropolis
Texas Rangers personnel
Yomiuri Giants players